Pelli Choopulu is a 1983 Indian Telugu-language romantic drama film directed by Parvataneni Sambasiva Rao. A remake of K. Bhagyaraj's Tamil film Thooral Ninnu Pochchu (1982), it stars Chandramohan and Vijayashanti. The film was released on 1 January 1983 and became a success.

Plot

Cast 
 Chandramohan
 Vijayashanti

Themes 
The main theme of Pelli Choopulu is "post-marital blues".

Soundtrack 
The music was composed by K. V. Mahadevan, while the lyrics were written by Acharya Aatreya and Jyothirmayi.

Release and reception 
Pelli Choopulu was released on 1 January 1983. The film was a commercial success, and emerged a breakthrough for Vijayashanti.

References

External links 
 

1980s Telugu-language films
1983 romantic drama films
Films scored by K. V. Mahadevan
Indian romantic drama films
Telugu remakes of Tamil films